CKTP-FM is a Canadian radio station in Fredericton, New Brunswick which goes by the name of 95.7 The Wolf. The station broadcasts a mix of roots rock and blues from its studios on the St. Mary's First Nation, at an FM frequency of 95.7 MHz.

References

External links
95.7 The Wolf
 

Ktp
Ktp
Ktp
Radio stations established in 2001
2001 establishments in New Brunswick